The women's tournament was one of two handball tournaments at the 1988 Summer Olympics. It was the fourth appearance of a women's handball tournament at the Olympic Games.

Qualification

Team rosters

Preliminary round

Group A

Group B

Placement round

Final round

Final ranking

References

Women's tournament
Women's events at the 1988 Summer Olympics